Maria Kraakman (born 5 August 1975) is a Dutch actress. She won the Golden Calf for Best Actress award twice at the Netherlands Film Festival.

Career 

Kraakman won the Golden Calf for Best Actress twice: for her role in the 2005 film Guernsey by Nanouk Leopold and the 2017 film In Blue by Jaap van Heusden. She also won the Theo d'Or award in 2010.

Kraakman has played roles in various Dutch films, including 06/05 (2004), My Queen Karo (2009) and Schneider vs. Bax (2015). She has also played roles in theatre plays by Toneelgroep Oostpool, Toneelgroep Amsterdam and Internationaal Theater Amsterdam.

Awards 

 2005: Golden Calf for Best Actress, Guernsey
 2010: Theo d'Or
 2018: Golden Calf for Best Actress, In Blue

References

External links 
 

1975 births
Living people
20th-century Dutch actresses
21st-century Dutch actresses
Dutch film actresses
Golden Calf winners
People from Soest, Netherlands